The 2020–21 Hannover 96 season was the 125th season in the football club's history and 25th overall and second consecutive season in the second flight of German football, the 2. Bundesliga. Hannover 96 also participated in this season's edition of the domestic cup, the DFB-Pokal. This was the 62nd season for Hannover in the HDI-Arena, located in Hanover, Lower Saxony, Germany.

Players

Squad information

Out on loan

Transfers

In

Out

Friendly matches

Competitions

Overview

2. Bundesliga

League table

Results summary

Results by round

Matches

DFB-Pokal

Statistics

Appearances and goals

|}

Goalscorers

Clean sheets

Disciplinary record

References

Hannover 96 seasons
Hannover 96